Wilfried Jochens is a German tenor. A graduate of Hamburg University and the State College for Music and Fine Arts, studying under Johannes Hoefflin, he has worked as a concert singer since 1972. He is particularly noted for his performances as the Evangelist in Bach's Passions. He has performed many of the Bach cantatas, and has also performed the principal oratorios of George Frideric Handel, Monteverdi, Haydn, Mozart and Felix Mendelssohn.  He is a member of the vocale ensemble Cantus Cölln. Since 1982 he has been a singing teacher at the Hamburg College of Music. Among his pupils was Knut Schoch.

References

External links

German tenors
Living people
1946 births
Place of birth missing (living people)